The 1967–68 Romanian Hockey League season was the 38th season of the Romanian Hockey League. Seven teams participated in the league, and Dinamo Bucuresti won the championship.

Regular season

External links
hochei.net

Rom
Romanian Hockey League seasons
1967–68 in Romanian ice hockey